The Energy Commission is a parastatal, mandated by law to regulate and manage the development and utilization of energy resources in Ghana, specifically in electricity licensing, renewable energy, natural gas and energy efficiency.

History
The Energy Commission of Ghana was founded by the enactment of an Act of the Parliament of Ghana, Energy Commission Act, 1997(Act 541).The primary supervisory body for the Commission is the Ministry of Energy and Petroleum (Ghana). Its precursor was the National Energy Board, started in 1989.

Mandate and functions
The Energy Commission is made up of seven Commissioners appointed by the President of Ghana with advice from the Council of State. The commissioners provide overall leadership in energy planning, regulation and innovation for the operations of the agency. The parastatal's core responsibilities include regulation, management, development and utilisation of sustainable energy resources in Ghana.

See also
 Energy law
 Ministry of Energy and Petroleum

External links
 Energy Commission

References

Government agencies established in 1997
1997 establishments in Ghana
Ministries and Agencies of State of Ghana